Mitica Constantin (née Junghiatu, born 18 August 1962) is a Romanian former middle-distance runner. She won two medals at the 1987 Summer Universiade.

Career
Constantin (as Mitica Junghiatu) won silver in the 800 metres behind Slobodanka Colovic, and bronze in the 1500m behind Paula Ivan and Svetlana Kitova at the 1987 Summer Universiade in Zagreb. She also reached the 800 metres final at the 1986 European Championships, and both the 800m and 1500m finals at the 1987 World Championships. In 1989, now competing under her married name, Constantin finished fifth in the 1500m final at the World Indoor Championships.

International competitions

References

1962 births
Living people
Romanian female middle-distance runners
Universiade medalists in athletics (track and field)
Goodwill Games medalists in athletics
World Athletics Championships athletes for Romania
Universiade silver medalists for Romania
Universiade bronze medalists for Romania
Medalists at the 1987 Summer Universiade
Competitors at the 1986 Goodwill Games